Dampierre-en-Bray (literally Dampierre in Bray) is a commune in the Seine-Maritime department in the Normandy region in northwestern France.

Geography

Population

Places of interest
 The thirteenth-century chateau des Huguenots at Beuvreuil.
 A fifteenth-century fortified manorhouse at Ramburesl.
 The church of St.Pierre at Dampierre, dating from the sixteenth century.
 The church of St.Pierre at Beuvreuil, dating from the eleventh century.

See also
Communes of the Seine-Maritime department

References

External links

Official website of the commune 

Communes of Seine-Maritime